The Upper West Akim constituency is in the Eastern region of Ghana. The current member of Parliament for the constituency is Joseph Sam Amankwanor. He was elected on the ticket of the National Democratic Congress  and  won a majority of 2,948 votes more than candidate closest in the race, to win the constituency election to become the MP. He succeeded Samuel Sallas Mensah who had represented the constituency in the 4th Republican parliament also on the ticket of the (NDC). The capital is Adeiso.

See also
List of Ghana Parliament constituencies

https://web.archive.org/web/20101208084535/http://www.ghanamps.gov.gh/mps/details.php?id=64

References

https://web.archive.org/web/20101208084535/http://www.ghanamps.gov.gh/mps/details.php?id=64

Parliamentary constituencies in the Eastern Region (Ghana)